The 2022 Ohio Athletic Conference football season was the season of college football played by the ten member schools of the Ohio Athletic Conference (OAC), sometimes referred to as the "Ohio Conference", as part of the 2022 NCAA Division III football season. 

The conference's statistical leaders during the regular season were: Braxton Plunk of Mount Union with 308.7 passing yards per game and 36 passing touchdowns; Bryce Agnew of Marietta with 137.6 rushing yards per game; and Wayne Ruby Jr. of Mount Union with 132.1 receiving yards per game.

Mount Union compiled a perfect 10–0 regular-season record, won the OAC championship, and was ranked No. 2 in the final NCAA Division III poll. The team advanced to the NCAA Division III playoffs.

Teams

Mount Union

The 2022  Mount Union Purple Raiders football team represented the University of Mount Union of Alliance, Ohio. In their third season under head coach Geoff Dartt, the Purple Raiders compiled a 10–0 regular-season record (9–0 against OAC opponents), and won the OAC championship. Mount Union advanced to the NCAA Division III Football Championship playoffs, beating  in the first round,  in the second round,  in the quarterfinals, Wartburg in the semifinals to meet North Central in the 2022 Stagg Bowl.

John Carroll

The 2022 John Carroll Blue Streaks football team represented John Carroll University of University Heights, Ohio. In their first year under interim head coach Drew Nystrom, the Blue Streaks compiled an 8–2 record (8–1 against OAC opponents) and finished in second place in the OAC.

Baldwin Wallace

The 2022  Baldwin Wallace Yellow Jackets football team represented Baldwin Wallace University of Berea, Ohio. In their sixth season under head coach Jim Hilvert, the Yellow Jackets compiled a 7–3 record (7–2 against OAC opponents) and finished in third place in the OAC.

Heidelberg

The 2022 Heidelberg Student Princes football team represented the Heidelberg University of Tiffin, Ohio. In their seventh season under head coach Scott Donaldson, the Student Princes compiled a 7–3 record (6–3 against OAC opponents) and finished in fourth place in the OAC.

Marietta

The 2022 Marietta Pioneers football team represented the Marietta College of Marietta, Ohio. In their tenth season under head coach Andy Waddle, the Pioneers compiled a 6–4 record (5–4 against OAC opponents) and finished in fifth place in the OAC.

Muskingum

The 2022 Muskingum Fighting Muskies football team represented Muskingum University of New Concord, Ohio. In their fifth season under head coach Erik Leuter, the Fighting Muskies compiled a 5–5 record (4–5 against OAC opponents) and finished in sixth place in the OAC.

Ohio Northern

The 2022 Ohio Northern Polar Bears football team represented Ohio Northern University of Ada, Ohio. In their 19th year under head coach Dean Paul, the Polar Bears compiled a 3–7 record (3–6 against OAC opponents) and finished in seventh place in the OAC.

Wilmington

The 2022 Wilmington Quakers football team represented Wilmington College of Wilmington, Ohio. Led by head coach Bryan Moore, the Quakers compiled a 3–7 record (2–7 against OAC opponents) and finished in eighth place in the OAC.

Otterbein

The 2022 Otterbein Cardinals football team represented Otterbein University of Westerville, Ohio. In their 11th season under head coach Tim Doup, the Cardinals compiled a 2–8 record (1–8 against OAC opponent) and finished in ninth place in the OAC.

Capital

The 2022 Capital Comets football team represented Capital University of Columbus, Ohio. In their third season under head coach Brian Foos, the Comets compiled a 0–10 record (0–9 against OAC opponent) and finished in last place in the OAC.

References

 
Ohio Athletic Conference football